Lakana, also known as la'kana or laka, are traditional outrigger canoes of the Malagasy people of Madagascar. It is a single-outrigger canoe with a dugout main hull. 

It is traditionally a sailing vessel, but most  lakana are now equipped with motor engines. The sailing rig could be one of two types. An Austronesian square-sail is more common (e.g. in Ambaro Bay). This rig is limited to largely downwind use, has limited ability to sail with the wind on the beam and no windward capability. In ordinary use, they are sailed out to the fishing grounds on the land breeze that occurs in the morning and then return on the sea breeze that starts later in the day. The lateen rig is used for larger lakana, with examples found in, for instance, Narindra Bay. The lateen rig allows a lakana to sail closer to the wind, so giving some windward performance.

The boat is often referred to by the general French term "pirogue", which can include boats with no outriggers. The technology was adapted in neighboring East Africa, like the Tanzanian ngalawa and the Fulani laana.

These are made from Farafatsy wood (Givotia madagascariensis (Euphorbiaceae)).  Its outrigger is of Mafaiboha wood (Commiphora mafaidoha (Burseraceae)) though locals prefer the Hazomalany wood  (Hazomalania voyronii of the family of Hernandiaceae).

See also
Jukung
Proa
Va'a

Nptes

References

Types of fishing vessels
Sailing ships
Outrigger canoes
Indigenous boats